Eva-Britt Svensson (born 5 December 1946 in Värnamo) is a Swedish politician and former Member of the European Parliament. She is a member of the Left Party.

Svensson has been vice-chair of the GUE/NGL group, and chair of the European Parliament's Committee on Women's Rights and Gender Equality. She was also a member of the Committee on the Internal Market and Consumer Protection, a substitute for the Committee on Employment and Social Affairs, a member of the delegation for relations with Israel, and a substitute for the delegation to the EU–Ukraine Parliamentary Cooperation Committee.

Svensson is known for opposing Europe-wide restrictions on freedom of speech and to prevent perceived gender stereotyping.

She left the Parliament in September 2011.

Career
 Political secretary of the Left Party (Vänsterpartiet) (1995–2004)
 Member of County Council for the Left Party (1995–2004)
 Member of the Left Party's Executive (since 2000)
 Member of executive committee
 Tenants' association Sweden (since 2000)
 Chair of the People's Movement No to the EU, Sweden (1992–2001)
 Vice-chair of the People's Movement No to the EU, Sweden (since 2001)

References

External links
 Evabrittsvensson.se, personal blog
 European Parliament biography
 

1946 births
Living people
People from Värnamo Municipality
Left Party (Sweden) MEPs
MEPs for Sweden 2004–2009
MEPs for Sweden 2009–2014
21st-century women MEPs for Sweden